AVI Records was an independent record label established in 1968, as a unit of American Variety International.  It released music from numerous genres, and was sufficiently successful with its disco recordings that it began doing its own distribution in 1977.

History
AVI Records began in 1968. It was formed by Seymour Heller, Ed Cobb and Ray Harris. American Variety International was subsequently incorporated in 1972, and Harris became president of the Record division. One of the Los Angeles–based label's earliest signings was Liberace, who was signed to the label through his manager Heller, and stayed with the company for more than 20 years.

The label was initially distributed on a case-by-case basis, usually through either Capitol, MGM Records, Dot Records or Tower. Harris started the label's disco initiative after attending a Midem convention and recognizing the selling potential of mixes and extended cuts. Additionally influenced by Donna Summer, Barry White and Van McCoy, AVI produced an album by studio group El Coco, passing off the product as European. AVI had laid the foundation for its own distribution in 1976, and activated this network in 1977 after having found success in the disco and R&B genres, particularly with El CoCo, while becoming the first label to produce custom jackets for its 12-inch singles. In February 1978, the label hired Rick Gianatos as a special consultant for its disco output, and he was later promoted to general A&R director. One of his initiatives was to court disco DJs by introducing expanded grooves, visual cues at key points in the recording accomplished by increasing the width between grooves. They were the second label after Motown to do this. Dubbed "Q-Mix", the method coincided with an increase in price designed to raise profit margins. After finding success in the disco field, AVI tried its hand in another 1970s musical phenomenon, punk.

AVI Records agreed to acquire Nashboro Records in 1979. As a result, AVI made a concerted effort to expand its gospel efforts by releasing new material as well as reissuing classic Nashboro recordings. By the mid-1990s, the label moved to Santa Monica, California, and was largely limited to releasing previously recorded material. In 1997, the label’s catalogue was acquired by MCA Records, the precursor of Universal Music Group. All 9,866 of AVI's master tapes were destroyed in the 2008 Universal fire.

Artists

 Air Power
 Dominic Allen
 Baby Rocker
 Don Bennett
 David Benoit
 Alicia Bridges
 Captain Sky
 Vince Cardell
 Dorothy Love Coates
 The Consolers
 B.C. & M. Choir
 Darkstar
 Davis Import
 Don De Grate Delegation
 Paul Delicato
 The Destinations
 Rev. Isaac Douglass
 Eastbound Expressway
 El Coco
 The Fairfield Four
 The Gospel Keynotes
 L.J. Johnson
 Gloria Jones
 Le Pamplemousse
 Liberace
 Lowrell
 Kenny Lupper
 Arnold McCuller
 Passion
 The Raindolls
 Jerry Rix
 Tony Sandler
 Seventh Avenue
 The Stars of Faith
 Rufus Thomas
 Jesus Wayne
 James Wells

References

External links
 45rpm discography for AVI Records

Record labels established in 1968
American record labels
American independent record labels
Companies based in Los Angeles